Midnight in the Garden of Good and Evil is a 1997 American mystery thriller film directed and produced by Clint Eastwood and starring John Cusack and Kevin Spacey. The screenplay by John Lee Hancock was based on John Berendt's 1994 book of the same name and follows the story of an antiques dealer, Jim Williams, on trial for the murder of a male prostitute who was his lover. The multiple trials depicted in Berendt's book are combined into one trial for the film.

Several real-life locals appear in the movie, notably in the party scene at Mercer House, including Williams' sister, Dorothy, and nieces Susan and Amanda, as well as Georgia senator John R. "Jack" Riley (his wife was played by Mary Alice Hendrix). Filming was permitted inside Mercer House, but action scenes were filmed later on a soundstage at Warner Bros.

Three people — The Lady Chablis, Emma Kelly and Jerry Spence — play themselves, while Sonny Seiler, one of Williams' lawyers in the book, plays Judge Samuel L. White. Danny Hansford, the shooting victim in the book, is renamed Billy Hanson in the film and is portrayed by a 24-year-old Jude Law, in one of his early film roles.

The film was shot entirely in Savannah, Georgia.

Plot

The panoramic tale of Savannah's eccentricities focuses on a murder and the subsequent trial of Jim Williams, a self-made man, art collector, antiques dealer, bon vivant, and semi-closeted homosexual. John Kelso, a magazine reporter with one book — Before the Fall — to his name, arrives in Savannah, amid beautiful architecture and odd doings, to write a feature for Town & Country on one of Williams' famous Christmas parties. After being unable to find a taxi, Kelso gets a ride from a tour-bus driver to Jones Street.

After a tour of Savannah's tourist hotspots, Kelso alights at Forsyth Park. Making his way to his lodging in Monterey Square, he has a brief interaction with Billy Hanson in front of Mercer House.

Kelso visits the Armstrong Mansion offices of Sonny Seiler, lawyer to Williams. Seiler introduces Kelso to Williams, and they take Seiler's dog, Uga IV, for a walk through Forsyth Park.

The following night, at Williams' annual Mercer House Christmas party, Kelso is guest of honor. Long after the guests have all left, Hanson is shot dead by Williams in his office after an argument between the two. Kelso stays on to cover the murder trial. Along the way, he meets some characters: the irrepressible The Lady Chablis, a transgender entertainer; Luther, a man who keeps flies attached to strings on his lapels and threatens daily to poison the water supply; Serena Dawes, a former silent-film actress; the Married Women's Card Club; and Minerva, a spiritualist and root doctor, based on real-life Valerie Boles.

Between becoming Williams' friend, cuddling-up to torch singer Mandy Nichols — also a love interest of Joe Odom — meeting every eccentric in Savannah, participating in midnight graveyard rituals, and helping solve the mysteries surrounding Hanson's murder, Kelso has his hands full. When Williams becomes confident he can win his case on a matter of flawed police procedure, he falsely testifies to killing Hanson with return fire in self-defense, to the disappointment of Kelso, to whom Williams has confessed he executed Hanson in retaliation for attempting to shoot him with the safety on. The judge and jury later find Williams not guilty.

As Kelso is leaving town, when saying goodbye to Williams, he asks one last question for the book: Does he want to tell him what really happened? Williams replies, "Truth, like art, is in the eye of the beholder. You believe what you choose, and I'll believe what I know." He watches from the window as Kelso walks away. Minutes later, Williams is stricken by a sudden heart attack and falls face down on the carpet. His heartbeat slows. He imagines Hanson lying alongside him, as he was in death. Their eyes meet, Hanson raises his head, smiles, then resumes his position, lifeless. The heartbeat has stopped. An overhead shot shows the two dead men lying like mirror images, then Hanson fades away.

After the funeral, Minerva tells Kelso he knows all he needs to know and warns him not to waste too much time on the dead.  “I love you, boy, but I ain’t the only one. You know that, don't you?” Later, Kelso signs a six-month lease on an apartment. To celebrate, he, Mandy and Lady Chablis, who is walking Uga, stroll off together for a picnic. Minerva, who is feeding squirrels in the park, laughs as they pass. Cut to the cemetery and shots of the two graves. The credits roll over film of Bird Girl, with k.d. lang singing “Skylark”, as she does in the movie's opening.

Cast

 John Cusack as John Kelso
 Kevin Spacey as Jim Williams
 Jack Thompson as Sonny Seiler
 Irma P. Hall as Minerva
 Jude Law as Billy Hanson
 Alison Eastwood as Mandy Nichols
 Paul Hipp as Joe Odom
 The Lady Chablis as Chablis Deveau
 Kim Hunter as Betty Harty
 Geoffrey Lewis as Luther Driggers
 Bob Gunton as  Finley Largent
 Richard Herd as Henry Skerridge
 Leon Rippy as Detective Boone
 Sonny Seiler as Judge Samuel L. White
 Dorothy Loudon as Serena Dawes 	
 Patrika Darbo as Sara Warren
 Michael Rosenbaum as George Tucker
 Jerry Spence as himself
 James Moody as William Glover 
 Georgia Allen as Lucille Wright
 Emma Kelly as herself

Clint Eastwood permitted The Lady Chablis to ad-lib some of her lines. He gave her the nickname the "one-take wonder". "We kind of hit the script in a roundabout way," confirmed John Cusack. "[During filming] they put me up at the Holiday Inn," explained Chablis in 2011. "So I told Clint: 'Y'all forgot. I am the Doll. I do not stay at the Holiday Inn.' There was not enough room there for my luggage. And Clint apologized. He said, 'I can't believe they did that to you, Doll.' He was so wonderful."

Gary Anthony Williams played the tour-bus driver at the beginning of the movie. He did more than just load the tourists' bags into the bus, however: "They hired me for the job, and for some reason they thought I could a drive a big double-decker bus that was from England," Williams explained in 2021. "With the steering wheel and gas and clutch on the opposite side, I thought I was going to kill a bunch of background actors that day. But Clint Eastwood was so cool. He put me at ease."

James Gandolfini made an uncredited appearance as the cook in the two scenes filmed at Clary's Cafe.

Production
"[My character] is based loosely on John [Berendt]," Cusack said in 1997. "John is a very funny, curious, mischievous, smart guy, so I was definitely able to pull those qualities that John actually has and put them into the John Kelso character."

Flavis, the squirrel Minerva talks to on the Forsyth Park bench at the beginning of the movie, was a trained animal.

Differences from the book
Several changes were made in adapting the film from the book. Many unused characters were eliminated or combined into remaining ones. John Berendt states at the end of his book: "All the characters in this book are real, but it bears mentioning that I have used pseudonyms for a number of them in order to protect their privacy." To create further distance, several character names in the movie are different than in the book.

John Berendt is removed from the journalistic role; the fictional John Kelso was introduced in his place, and a love interest was added for the film
Danny Hansford is renamed Billy Hanson
Lee Adler, the former member of the Telfair Museums board, becomes Lorne Atwell
George Oliver, the judge in Williams' trial, is now Samuel L. White. Oliver died in 2004 at the age of 89
Spencer Lawton, the district attorney who prosecutes Williams, is renamed Finley Largent
Greg Kerr, one of those called to witness, becomes George Tucker
Prentiss Crowe's lines about the deceased being "a good time not yet had by all" were instead spoken by Serena Dawes
Sonny Clarke, a member of the Oglethorpe Club, said the line, "They're saying he shot the best piece of ass in Savannah" in the book, but it was given to Joe Odom in the movie

The multiple trials were combined into one on-screen trial. Williams' real life attorney, Sonny Seiler, played Samuel L. White, the presiding judge of the trial. Seiler was originally cast as a juror, but Eastwood persuaded him to take on the role of the judge. "I said, 'I'm not an actor,' and Clint said, 'Of course you are. All lawyers are actors, and you are one of the best. If you do this for me, I won't have to hire a dialect coach.'" Seiler's daughter, Bess Thompson, appears in the movie as the "pretty girl" in Forsyth Park who asks if she can have her picture taken with Uga.

Advertising
Advertising for the film became a source of controversy when Warner Bros. used elements of Jack Leigh's famous photograph in the posters without permission, infringing copyright law.

Filming locations

While entertaining the role of being the film's director, Clint Eastwood visited Savannah, Georgia, where the entire film was shot, in 1996. "I didn't get to know too many people at that time — mostly places — but I did meet some people who knew about the Jim Williams episode. And I met the attorney, Sonny Seiler, who was very, very helpful in making everyone understand what the attitude and atmosphere was in Savannah in the 1980s," he said. Principal photography began in spring the following year.

"[John Berendt and I] spoke a lot about the novel and he took us on a tour of Savannah — The John Berendt Tour — which is a great tour of Savannah," John Cusack said in 1997. "We talked about the screenplay. He was very helpful." As for Savannah itself: "I'd definitely go back and hang out. It's a fun place. It's terrific being in a place that isn't interested in being modern. It's not interested in the fast-paced, kinetic lifestyle that we all lead. It's very relaxed; it's got a slow rhythm. All the squares that are in the middle of the town are made so that you can't speed through in traffic; you have to go leisurely around. Cocktail parties and parties are a big deal. It's interested in preserving its past; it's not interested in moving towards the future. It's interested in the way it is. It's very lush and exotic and mysterious."

Several scenes were filmed in and around Monterey Square. Jim Williams' Mercer House is located in the southwestern tything block of the square, at 429 Bull Street. Williams' sister, Dorothy Kingery, became the owner of the house after her brother's death. After initially agreeing to permit filming to take place inside the home, she developed cold feet. "Clint Eastwood came from California the next day," Kingery said. "We talked about my concerns, and he addressed those." While most of the scenes were filmed inside the home, the fight and shooting scenes were done in a California studio. When it came to the Christmas party scenes, the house contained so many valuable pieces of art and furniture that it presented a security problem. Eastwood, therefore, decided not to use extras. He instead sent out engraved invitations to the same locals that Williams used to invite to his parties.

John Kelso is shown being welcomed by Mrs. Baxter to the Italianate house at 2 East Taylor Street — the 1880-built former home of Hugh Comer (1842–1900), president of Central of Georgia Railroad, on the square's northeastern ward. Kelso does not stay there in the movie, however; his carriage-house apartment was built on a soundstage in Burbank, California. Window shots from inside the carriage house were filmed across from 115 East Jones Street, which Joe Odom was looking after for its owner, who was in New York. (Odom's house, constructed by Eliza Jewett in 1847, was at 16 East Jones Street.) Kelso's six-month rental, shown at the end of the film, is 218 West Jones Street, which is now valued at over $1.15 million.

The scenes at Sonny Seiler's offices were filmed at the Armstrong House, 447 Bull Street, south of Monterey Square and close to the northern edge of Forsyth Park. John Bouhan was one of the partners of Bouhan, Williams & Levy, which moved into Armstrong House in 1970. Bouhan died the following year, but his dog, Patrick, was taken for daily walks by the law firm's porter, William Glover (James Moody), long after Bouhan's death. In 2017, Bouhan Falligant LLP moved to One West Park Avenue after developer Richard C. Kessler bought Armstrong House. Seiler retired just before the move.

The courthouse scenes were filmed at the Tomochichi Federal Building and United States Courthouse, in the western trust lot of Wright Square. Dixie's Flowers, the flower shop Mandy works at, is in the northeastern tything lot of the square, at 6 East State Street.

The residence used as The Lady Chablis' home is 418 East Liberty Street. The Myra Bishop Family Clinic she walks to is at 311 Habersham Street, about 500 feet away.

Kelso has breakfast (and an evening coffee with Mandy) at Clary's Cafe, at 404 Abercorn Street. Photos of the cast taken during down time from filming are hung by the door to the diner.

The Married Women's Card Club is at 126 East Gaston Street, now known as Granite Hall and part of SCAD.

Churchill's Pub was located at 9 Drayton Street at the time of filming, but it was damaged in a fire six years later and closed.

The Debutante Ball was filmed at the Savannah Inn and Country Club. (It later became Wilmington Island Club but was renamed back to Savannah Inn and Country Club in 2018.)

Bonaventure Cemetery, on the city's eastern edge, is featured on several occasions, including for the funeral service of Jim Williams which was shot near Johnny Mercer's burial site. Minerva performs her mysterious incantations at the "colored cemetery" just beyond Bonaventure in the movie. (In the book, said cemetery is in Beaufort, South Carolina, within walking distance of Minerva's home. Also, Dr. Eagle, the common-law husband of Valerie Boles, the inspiration for Minerva, is renamed Dr. Buzzard.)

Forsyth Park is the venue for the dog-walking scenes, including the cameo appearance of Uga V, the English bulldog live mascot of the University of Georgia, playing his father, Uga IV. Uga V died two years after filming. The Uga mascots live in Savannah between football games.

Candler Hospital is erroneously pronounced Chandler Hospital throughout the film.

After location filming ended in June 1997, a fundraiser was held at and for Savannah's Lucas Theatre, which was built in 1921. Spacey donated $200,000 in Williams' honor to assist in the $7.6-million renovation of the theatre. "I love Savannah. I had a great time here," said Spacey, an Oscar winner in 1996 for his role in The Usual Suspects. "I plan to visit again. And once this (theater) gets done, I'll bring a play here." It was hoped that the movie's premiere would take place at the Lucas, but it was instead held on November 17 at Warner Bros. Studios in Burbank. Its Savannah premiere occurred on November 20 at the Johnny Mercer Theater. It opened nationwide the following day.

Soundtrack

The soundtrack for the film was released in 1997. It is also dedicated to Johnny Mercer. The CD includes versions of songs heard in the film.

Reception
Midnight in the Garden of Good and Evil was a box office failure, grossing $25.1 million to an estimated $30 million budget. It received mixed reviews. It scores 50% on review aggregator Rotten Tomatoes, based on 38 reviews with an average rating of 5.9/10. The site's consensus states: "Clint Eastwood's spare directorial style proves an ill fit for this Southern potboiler, which dutifully trudges through its mystery while remaining disinterested in the cultural flourishes that gave its source material its sense of intrigue." On Metacritic, the film has a weighted average score of 57 out of 100, based on 23 critics, indicating "mixed or average reviews". Audiences polled by CinemaScore gave the film an average grade of "C+" on an A+ to F scale.

"Kevin Spacey played Jim Williams -- badly," John Berendt said in a 2015 interview. "He didn't even come close. I had offered [Spacey] recordings so he could listen to Jim Williams talking to me, regaling me with stories while sitting in his living room in Mercer House. [Spacey] said he'd already heard Williams on tape talking during one of his trials. But when I saw the movie, I was perplexed by the way Spacey portrayed Williams, because he did it as if he were asleep. He talked as if he were in a fog or sleepwalking. Then I realized what had happened, and I thought it was hilariously funny." Berendt believes Spacey listened to tapes of Williams during the third trial, when he had taken Valium.

References
Specific

General

External links
 
 
 
 

1997 films
1997 crime drama films
1997 crime thriller films
1997 LGBT-related films
American crime drama films
American crime thriller films
American LGBT-related films
1990s English-language films
1990s French-language films
Films directed by Clint Eastwood
Films produced by Clint Eastwood
Films based on non-fiction books
Films set in Savannah, Georgia
Films shot in Savannah, Georgia
American neo-noir films
Southern Gothic films
Malpaso Productions films
Silver Pictures films
Warner Bros. films
Films about trans women
Films scored by Lennie Niehaus
Films with screenplays by John Lee Hancock
1997 drama films
1990s American films